Hathor (Hathōr), also known as Athyr (Athýr) and Hatur, is the third month of the ancient Egyptian and Coptic calendars. It lies between November 10 and December 9 of the Gregorian calendar. The month of Hathor is also the third month of the season of Akhet (Inundation) in Ancient Egypt, when the Nile floods historically covered the land of Egypt; they have not done so since the construction of the High Dam at Aswan.

Name
The name of the month comes from Hathor, one of the most important goddesses in ancient Egypt. Festivals in her honor are thought to have taken place throughout the month.

Coptic Synaxarium of the month of Hathor

See also
 Egyptian, Coptic, and Islamic calendars

References

Citations

Bibliography
  Synaxarium of the month of Hatour

Months of the Coptic calendar
Egyptian calendar
Hathor